General Sir Alexander Duff  (1777 – 21 March 1851) was a British Army officer of the Napoleonic era.

Duff was the second son of Alexander Duff, 3rd Earl Fife and the younger brother of James Duff, 4th Earl Fife. In 1793, he was commissioned an ensign in the 66th Regiment of Foot, and served at Gibraltar, in Flanders, in the East Indies in 1798, and under Baird during the invasion of Egypt. In 1806, Duff commanded the centre column in the attack on Buenos Aires.

He was appointed colonel of the 92nd Regiment of Foot in 1823, transferring to 37th Regiment of Foot in 1831. He was made GCH and knighted in 1834, and was promoted full general on 28 June 1838.

He was elected the Member of Parliament for Elgin Burghs, sitting from 1826 to 1831.  From 1848 until his death he was Lord Lieutenant of Elginshire, and a deputy lieutenant of Banffshire. He lived at Delgatie Castle near Turriff, Aberdeenshire.

He had married Anne Stein, daughter of James Stein of Kilbagie and Kennetpans House, by whom he had two sons and two daughters, including James Duff, 5th Earl Fife and George Skene Duff.

He died at Percy Cross, Walham Green, Fulham, Middlesex in March 1851.

Freemasonry
He was Initiated into Scottish Freemasonry in Lodge Holyrood House (St Luke's), No.44, on 30 November 1812.

References

External links 
 

|-

|-

1777 births
1851 deaths
Younger sons of earls
British Army generals
Royal Berkshire Regiment officers
37th Regiment of Foot officers
Deputy Lieutenants of Banffshire
Lord-Lieutenants of Elginshire
Members of the Parliament of the United Kingdom for Scottish constituencies
UK MPs 1826–1830
UK MPs 1830–1831